"Still in Love with You" is a song by then Australian-based New Zealand rock band Dragon, released in October 1978 as the second and final single to be released from the band's fifth studio album O Zambezi (1978).

Overview 
One of a series of songs written by keyboardist Paul Hewson, "Still in Love with You" is a live staple for the band.

Track listing 
 "Still in Love with You" (Paul Hewson) – 3:22
 "Politics" (Robert Taylor, Todd Hunter, Jen Hunter-Brown) – 3:57

Personnel 
 Todd Hunter – bass guitar, vocals
 Kerry Jacobson – drums
 Paul Hewson – keyboards, vocals
 Robert Taylor – lead guitar, vocals
 Marc Hunter – lead vocals
 Richard Lee – Vitar violin

Charts

References 

Dragon (band) songs
1978 singles
1978 songs
Portrait Records singles
Song recordings produced by Peter Dawkins (musician)